Gottlieb Keim (10 March 1783 – 29 August 1868) was a member of the Frankfurt Parliament.

Life 

Hired against Napoleon Bonaparte, he entered the Prussian judicial service after his studies. After Franconia had been occupied and handed over to Bavaria, he refused to join the Bavarian civil service (Bavaria was on the side of the opponent).

Subsequently, he became a freelance lawyer and city councillor in Bayreuth. The city sent him in 1848 as a member of the Frankfurt Parliament.

Keim died in Bayreuth August 29, 1868, at the age of 85.

Literature 
 Dieter Mronz: Gottlieb Friedr. Ferd. Keim 1783–1868. Jahrbuch des , vol. 31 (1986), 
 : Corpsstudenten in der Paulskirche, Einst und Jetzt, special issue 1990,

References

External links 

1783 births
1868 deaths
People from Kulmbach
Members of the Frankfurt Parliament